My Father's Eyes is the second studio album by then-teenage Christian singer-songwriter Amy Grant, released in 1979 on Myrrh Records. My Father's Eyes was a turning point in Grant's career. It gave her her first Christian number-one hit in the title track, as well as the Top Ten Christian hit "Faith Walkin' People." The album would be certified gold in 1987 and was nominated for the Grammy Award for Best Gospel Performance, Contemporary.

In 2007, like many other albums by Grant, My Father's Eyes was reissued by Sparrow Records, her current label.

Track listing

Personnel 
 Amy Grant – vocals
 Bobby Ogdin – keyboards, (1, 2, 3, 7, 9), acoustic piano (6), Fender Rhodes (10), ARP synthesizer (11)
 Shane Keister – Polymoog (2), organ (6), Moog synthesizer (10)
 Randy Goodrum – keyboards (4), ARP synthesizer (10)
 Marty McCall – keyboards (5), harmony vocals (5), backing vocals (7, 9)
 Jon Goin – acoustic guitar (1, 4, 12), electric guitar (1, 7, 9, 10), guitar (5)
 Larry Byrom – electric guitar (2, 4), guitar (3), acoustic guitar (6, 10), banjo (11)
 Ron Elder – acoustic guitar (3)
 Steve Schaffer – bass (1)
 Bob Wray – bass (2, 3, 6, 7, 9, 11)
 Jack Williams – bass (4, 10)
 Bob Sinkovic – bass (5)
 Roger Clark – drums (1-4, 6, 7, 9, 10, 11), percussion (1)
 Lanny Avery – Syndrum (3), drums (5); cords, spoons, snaps, snare drum and jaw pops (13)
 Farrell Morris – percussion (2, 9), xylophone (11)
 Denis Solee – flute (1, 5, 11), piccolo (5)
 Ann Fuller Wilder – oboe (4)
 Kurt Storey – fiddle (5)
 Ava Aldridge – backing vocals (4, 7, 9, 13)
 Lenny LeBlanc – backing vocals (4, 13), harmony vocals (6)
 Marie Tomlinson – backing vocals (4, 7, 9, 13)
 Brown Bannister – backing vocals (8), harmony vocals (12)
 Steve Chapman – backing vocals (8)
 Mimi Verner – backing vocals (8)
 Carol Grant – backing vocals (8)
 Kathy Harrell – backing vocals (8)
 Tim Fletcher – backing vocals (8)
 Randy Elder – backing vocals (8)

Production 
 Brown Bannister – producer
 Michael Blanton – executive producer
 Chris Christian – executive producer
 Glenn Meadows – mastering at Masterfonics (Nashville, Tennessee)
 Buddy Skipper – horn arrangements
 Bergen White – string arrangements
 John Miller – photography
 Hot Graphics – album cover design
 Amy Grant – liner notes

Charts

Weekly charts

End of year charts

References 

Amy Grant albums
1979 albums
Albums produced by Brown Bannister
Myrrh Records albums